Giacomo Trécourt (1812 – 1882) was an Italian painter.

Biography
He was born in Bergamo, and died in Pavia. He was a pupil of Giuseppe Diotti at the Accademia Carrara in Bergamo. In 1842, he was nominated director of the School of Painting in Pavia, where he remained. He painted altarpieces for the churches of Zanica, Urgnano, and Villongo. He painted an equestrian portrait of King Vittorio Emanuele, conserved in the University of Pavia. His brother Francesco Trecourt was also a painter. Among his pupils was Pacifico Buzio.

References

External links

1812 births
1882 deaths
19th-century Italian painters
Italian male painters
Painters from Bergamo
19th-century Italian male artists